Rushing Branch is a tributary of Brown Creek in Anson County, North Carolina that rises near Becky Hill, then flows northwest follows to Brown Creek near White Store, North Carolina. The watershed is about 83% forested, 12% agricultural and the rest is of other land uses.

See also
List of North Carolina rivers

References

Rivers of North Carolina
Rivers of Anson County, North Carolina
Rivers of Union County, North Carolina
Tributaries of the Pee Dee River